Son Hee-jung (also Son Hui-jeong, ; born July 6, 1987) is a South Korean amateur road and track cyclist. She represented her nation South Korea at the 2008 Summer Olympics, and later helped the South Koreans capture the women's team pursuit title at the |2013 Asian Cycling Championships.

Son qualified for the South Korean squad in the women's road race at the 2008 Summer Olympics in Beijing by receiving a single berth from the defunct UCI B World Championships. Passing through a three-hour limit and a 102.6-km mark, Son fell to the ground after a heavy collision with six other cyclists and did not finish the race.

At the 2011 Summer Universiade in Shenzhen, Son joined her teammate Gu Sun-Geun to stand on the podium, as she handed the South Koreans a 1–2 finish with a silver medal time in 3:31:42.

Two years later, at the 2013 Asian Cycling Championships in New Delhi, Son and her South Korean squad (led by 2012 Olympian Lee Min-Hye) posted a time of 4:41.500 to defeat Japan for the gold medal in the final match of the women's 4 km team pursuit.

Major results
2011
  Universiade (Road), Shenzhen (CHN)
  Universiade (TTT), Shenzhen (CHN)
2013
  Asian Championships (Track – Team pursuit), New Delhi (IND)
2014
3rd  Team Pursuit, Asian Games (with Lee Chaek-Yung, Lee Ju-mi, Lee Min-hye, Na Ah-reum and Yu-ri Kim)

References

External links
NBC 2008 Olympics profile

1987 births
Living people
South Korean female cyclists
Cyclists at the 2008 Summer Olympics
Olympic cyclists of South Korea
Asian Games medalists in cycling
Cyclists at the 2006 Asian Games
Cyclists at the 2014 Asian Games
Universiade medalists in cycling
Medalists at the 2014 Asian Games
Asian Games silver medalists for South Korea
Universiade silver medalists for South Korea
20th-century South Korean women
21st-century South Korean women